Sue Brooks (born 1 May 1953) is an Australian film director and producer. She has directed five films since 1984. She won the "Golden Alexander" (first prize) for Best Feature-Length Film at The International Thessaloniki Film Festival for her film Road to Nhill (1997). Her film Japanese Story was screened in the Un Certain Regard section at the 2003 Cannes Film Festival.

Filmography
 The Drover's Wife (1984)
 An Ordinary Woman (1988)
 Road to Nhill (1997)
 Japanese Story (2003)
 Subdivision (2009)
 Looking for Grace (2015)

References

External links

1953 births
Living people
Australian film producers
Australian women film directors
Australian film directors
People from Victoria (Australia)